The Beautiful Dream may refer to:

 "The Beautiful Dream", one of The Complete Fairy Tales of Hermann Hesse written in 1912
 The Beautiful Dream, a 1978 painting and essay by Anthony Green
 "The Beautiful Dream", a 2018 song by George Ezra from the album Staying at Tamara's